Herbert Randall Wright III (born October 8, 1995), better known by his stage name G Herbo (formerly Lil Herb), is an American rapper from Chicago.

G Herbo is signed to Machine Entertainment Group. He has released the mixtapes Welcome to Fazoland (2014), Pistol P Project (2014), Ballin Like I'm Kobe (2015), and Strictly 4 My Fans (2016). His studio albums are his debut Humble Beast (2017) and with Southside of 808 Mafia, Swervo (2018), his first major release through Epic Records. His third studio album, PTSD (2020), became his first top-ten entry on the Billboard 200, while his fourth album, 25, was released in 2021, and marked his first release through Republic Records.

Early life 
Wright grew up in Chicago, Illinois. He dropped out of school when he was 16, having attended Hyde Park Academy High School. He was influenced by Meek Mill, Jeezy, Gucci Mane, Yo Gotti and Lil Wayne. He is close friends with fellow rapper Lil Bibby with whom he has collaborated on numerous songs. Both artists are associated with the family N.L.M.B., which was originally formed from the merger of No Limit, a renegade faction of the Almighty Black P. Stone Nation, and the Muskegon Boyz, a renegade faction of the Gangster Disciples, although the initials N.L.M.B. are also currently used by the gang to signify "Never Leave My Brothers," and "No Limit Muskegon Boys." Wright has stated that N.L.M.B. is a "brotherhood" rather than a gang.

Career

2012–2014: Career beginnings and Welcome to Fazoland 

G Herbo and Lil Bibby first gained attention with the song "Kill Shit", which has since been viewed over 50 million times on YouTube. Lil Herb and Lil Bibby gained broader attention within the hip-hop community when Canadian rapper Drake called them "the future".

Herbo's first mixtape, Welcome to Fazoland, was released on February 17, 2014. The mixtape is named in honor of Fazon Robinson, one of the first of Herbo's friends to be killed by gun violence in Chicago. Welcome to Fazoland was met with broad critical acclaim, with Fader commenting that, "since drill rose to prominence a few years ago, lyrical bankruptcy has remained one of its most common critiques; Herb's way with words defies the stereotype."

In April 2014, Herbo collaborated with East Coast rapper Nicki Minaj on "Chiraq". He contributed to Common's "The Neighborhood" on his album, Nobody's Smiling. Herb was selected for XXLs Show & Prove segment of the 2014 Freshman Class issue. Herbo also recorded "Fight or Flight (Remix)" with Chance the Rapper and Common.

2014–2016: Pistol P Project and Ballin Like I'm Kobe 

On December 26, 2014, Herbo released the surprise mixtape Pistol P Project, his second project of 2014.

On April 2, 2015, Herbo guest featured on Chief Keef's "Faneto (Remix)" with fellow Chicago rappers King Louie, Lil Bibby.

On June 9, 2015, after being omitted from the 2015 XXL Freshman Cover, Herbo released a single titled "XXL". In response, XXL gave compliments to the rapper, saying he "switches between different flows effortlessly". On June 13, 2016, XXL announced the 2016 Freshman Class, which includes Herbo.

On August 4, 2015, Herbo announced his third mixtape, Ballin Like I'm Kobe, named in honor of his fallen friend Jacobi D. Herring. On September 3, 2015, it was announced that Wright had signed with Cinematic Music Group and had officially changed his rap moniker to G Herbo. On September 27, 2015, Herb announced that Ballin Like I'm Kobe would be released on September 29, 2015. On September 29, 2015, the mixtape was released to widespread critical acclaim.

On November 11, 2015, Herbo released a collaborative single, titled "Lord Knows", with New York rapper Joey Badass.

2016–2018: Humble Beast and Strictly 4 My Fans /  Welcome to Fazoland 1.5 

In an interview at SXSW on April 4, 2016, Herbo announced his debut albums' title, Humble Beast, stating that "You can definitely expect an album in 2016." In mid 2016, he released two singles, "Pull Up" and "Drop". Herbo also dropped the single "Yeah I Know" in March 2016. Herbo also released a fourth single "Ain't Nothing to Me", with a music video being released on October 10, 2016. Herbo was featured on DJ Twin's song "They Know Us" with Sean Kingston and Lil Bibby. On November 17, 2016, Herb released the album art, release date, and track list for his fourth mixtape, Strictly 4 My Fans. On the same day, he released the second single from the mixtape, "Strictly 4 My Fans (Intro)". It was also revealed that Herbo and Lil Bibby have a collaborative project, No Limitation, in the works. On March 17, 2017, Herbo released Welcome To Fazoland 1.5, containing unreleased songs from Welcome To Fazoland. The single "Yea I Know", was released in March 2016. Three singles were released for Humble Beast. The lead single, "Red Snow", was released on March 9, 2017. The second single, "I Like", was released on August 11, 2017. The third and final single "Everything", was released on August 25, 2017. "4 Minutes of Hell, Pt. 5" was released as a pre-order single on September 1, 2017. Later that month, on September 22, 2017, Humble Beast was released. Herbo later drops a deluxe edition of the album Humble Beast with more songs in 2018.

2018–present: Swervo, Still Swervin, PTSD, and 25 

On March 16, 2018, Herbo went on radio station K104 in Dallas, Texas, and did a freestyle to the beat used in the song "Who Run It". Six days later, the full remix was released on all music platforms. The freestyle caught so much attention, later the rapper Lil Uzi Vert eventually featured on his own remix to "Who Run It". Before this collaboration happened, Herbo released the single "Shook". This song appeared on the deluxe edition to his album Humble Beast, which was released in 2018. Throughout the year, he released a couple of other singles titled "Focused" and "Swervo". On July 27, 2018, Herbo released the album Swervo, which included features from rappers 21 Savage, Chief Keef, Young Thug, and Juice Wrld. This album included the singles "Swervo", "Focused", and "Who Run It", but not the remix featuring Lil Uzi Vert. This album was entirely produced by Southside. They had worked together before but never on a full album. On December 14, 2018, Vic Mensa released his album titled HOOLIGANS. Herbo was featured on the song "Rowdy". In early 2019, the single "Up It" was released, this appeared on his second album entirely produced by Southside titled Still Swervin, which was released on February 1, 2019.

On February 28, 2020, G Herbo released the album PTSD with 14 tracks and featuring A Boogie wit da Hoodie, BJ the Chicago Kid, Lil Durk, Chance the Rapper, Juice Wrld, Lil Uzi Vert, 21 Savage, Polo G, and multiple other artists. The album debuted at number 7 on the Billboard 200.

On December 18, 2020, G Herbo returned with a new song and video, "Statement". In it, he addresses and denies fraud charges brought against him and multiple other alleged associates earlier the month.

In a February 2021 interview, Lil Bibby said that G Herbo had contacted him with regards to completing work on their upcoming collaborative effort, No Limitations. Bibby stated that he is ready to finish the project in 2021.

On March 5, Herbo returned with two new singles, "Break Yoself" and "Really Like That". Both songs sees Herbo "operating in a stripped-back mode, with eerie beats and a non-stop delivery". The songs are included on Herbo's fourth studio album, 25, which was released on July 2, 2021. The album has an additional 16 tracks.

Personal life 
Wright has a son, born in 2018, from his relationship with Ariana Fletcher. As of December 2020, he is engaged to Taina Williams, stepdaughter of rapper Fabolous; she gave birth to their first child, a boy, on May 27, 2021.

Legal issues 
In February 2018, Wright and two other men were arrested after their limousine driver informed police that some of his passengers had weapons. Wright was observed in the rear driver-side passenger seat placing a Fabrique National handgun in the seat rear pocket. Neither Wright nor the other two men had Illinois firearm owner's identification cards, and all three were charged with aggravated unlawful use of a weapon, a felony under the Illinois Compiled Statutes. In 2019, Wright plead guilty to one count of unlawful use of a weapon, a misdemeanor, and was sentenced to two years of probation.

Wright was arrested in Atlanta on April 19, 2019, for simple battery after an alleged physical altercation with the mother of his child, Ariana "Ari" Fletcher. Fletcher shared her story on Instagram on Thursday, April 18, stating, "He kicked my door down to get in my house because I wouldn't let him in, beat the fuck out of me in front of my son. Then he took my son outside to his friends and had them drive off with my son, hid all my knifes in my house, broke my phone and locked me inside and beat the fuck out of me again…" She stated there were physical signs of abuse as well, such as a black eye, and scrapes, cuts and bruises all over her body. Wright was released one week later on $2,000 bail. Upon his release, he took to Instagram Live to discuss the altercation with Fletcher. In the video session, Herbo stated that Fletcher had stolen jewelry from his mother's house. Specifically he stated, "I've been quiet all this time. I ain't do no insurance claim or try to get you locked up. Nothing. You told me to come to Atlanta to get the jewelry back."

On December 2, 2020, Wright and several associates, Antonio "T-Glo" Strong, Wright's promoter and manager; South Side rapper Joseph "Joe Rodeo" Williams; and alleged co-conspirators Steven Hayes Jr., Demario Sorrells and Terrence Bender, all from Chicago, were indicted on 14 federal charges that included wire fraud, and aggravated identity theft, in a federal court in Massachusetts. It was alleged that Wright and his associates charged expensive trips, bought designer puppies, rented luxury villas in Jamaica, private jets, and all of these luxury services and purchases were from using stolen identification. It is alleged that the fraud amounted to millions of dollars over a four-year period dating back to 2016. Wright has maintained his innocence and according to his management team, he "looks forward to establishing his innocence in court".

Charity 
In 2018, Wright contributed to the redevelopment of a former elementary school in Chicago, Anthony Overton Elementary School. In this building, Wright's goal was to include equipment that could potentially help young people who want to become musicians. He also aimed to include free programs and sports to keep youngsters busy so they are not involved in street life.
In July 2020, Wright launched Swervin' Through Stress, an initiative that provides Black youths with therapeutic resources to improve their mental health over a 12-week course. The project was inspired by his own experiences and the truama others faced within his community, as well as his complex post-traumatic stress disorder which stemmed from his own earlier therapy sessions. He elaborated, "I don't want to be that guy to have all the resources to change my neighborhood, change my city and the youth and do nothing with it. That's why it's so important to me to be honest".

Discography 

Studio albums
 Humble Beast (2017)
 Still Swervin (2019)
 PTSD (2020)
 25 (2021)
 Survivor's Remorse (2022)

Collaborative albums
 Swervo (with Southside) (2018)

Filmography

Film

Notes

References 

1995 births
Living people
African-American male rappers
Almighty Black P. Stone Nation
American hip hop singers
Hardcore hip hop artists
Drill musicians
Gangsta rappers
Midwest hip hop musicians
Rappers from Chicago
21st-century American rappers
21st-century American male musicians
Epic Records artists
21st-century African-American musicians